GIMP (GNU Image Manipulation Program) is a free and open-source raster graphics editor used for image manipulation (retouching) and image editing, free-form drawing, transcoding between different image file formats, and more specialized tasks. It is not designed to be used for drawing, though some artists and creators have used it for such.

GIMP is released under the GPL-3.0-or-later license and is available for Linux, macOS, and Microsoft Windows.

History 
In 1995, Spencer Kimball and Peter Mattis began developing GIMP – originally named General Image Manipulation Program — as a semester-long project at the University of California, Berkeley for the eXperimental Computing Facility. The acronym was coined first, with the letter G being added to -IMP as a reference to "the gimp" in the scene from the 1994 Pulp Fiction film.

In 1996 was the initial public release of GIMP (0.54). The editor was quickly adopted and a community of contributors formed. The community began developing tutorials, artwork and shared better work-flows and techniques.

In the following year, Kimball and Mattis met with Richard Stallman of the GNU Project while he visited UC Berkeley and asked if they could change General in the application's name to GNU (the name of the operating system created by Stallman), and Stallman approved. The application subsequently formed part of the GNU software collection. 

The first release supported Unix systems, such as Linux, SGI IRIX and HP-UX. Since then, GIMP has been ported to other operating systems, including Microsoft Windows (1997, GIMP 1.1) and macOS.

A GUI toolkit called GTK (at the time known as the GIMP ToolKit) was developed to facilitate the development of GIMP. The development of the GIMP ToolKit has been attributed to Peter Mattis becoming disenchanted with the Motif toolkit GIMP originally used. Motif was used up until GIMP 0.60.

Versions

Development 

GIMP is primarily developed by volunteers as a free and open source software project associated with both the GNU and GNOME projects. Development takes place in a public git source code repository, on public mailing lists and in public chat channels on the GIMPNET IRC network.

New features are held in public separate source code branches and merged into the main (or development) branch when the GIMP team is sure they won't damage existing functions. Sometimes this means that features that appear complete do not get merged or take months or years before they become available in GIMP.

GIMP itself is released as source code. After a source code release, installers and packages are made for different operating systems by parties who might not be in contact with the maintainers of GIMP.

The version number used in GIMP is expressed in a major-minor-micro format, with each number carrying a specific meaning: the first (major) number is incremented only for major developments (and is currently 2). The second (minor) number is incremented with each release of new features, with odd numbers reserved for in-progress development versions and even numbers assigned to stable releases; the third (micro) number is incremented before and after each release (resulting in even numbers for releases, and odd numbers for development snapshots) with any bug fixes subsequently applied and released for a stable version.

Previously, GIMP applied for several positions in the Google Summer of Code (GSoC). From 2006 to 2009 there have been nine GSoC projects that have been listed as successful, although not all successful projects have been merged into GIMP immediately. The healing brush and perspective clone tools and Ruby bindings were created as part of the 2006 GSoC and can be used in version 2.8.0 of GIMP, although there were three other projects that were completed and are later available in a stable version of GIMP; those projects being Vector Layers (end 2008 in 2.8 and master), and a JPEG 2000 plug-in (mid 2009 in 2.8 and master). 
Several of the GSoC projects were completed in 2008, but have been merged into a stable GIMP release later in 2009 to 2014 for Version 2.8.xx and 2.10.x. Some of them needed some more code work for the master tree.

Second public Development 2.9-Version was 2.9.4 with many deep improvements after initial Public Version 2.9.2. Third Public 2.9-Development version is Version 2.9.6. One of the new features is removing the 4 GB size limit of XCF file. Increase of possible threads to 64 is also an important point for modern parallel execution in actual AMD Ryzen and Intel Xeon processors. Version 2.9.8 included many bug fixes and improvements in gradients and clips. Improvements in performance and optimization beyond bug hunting were the development targets for 2.10.0. MacOS Beta is available with Version 2.10.4.

The next stable version in the roadmap is 3.0 with a GTK3 port. 2.99-Series is the development Series to 3.0.

GIMP developers meet during the annual Libre Graphics Meeting. Interaction designers from OpenUsability have also contributed to GIMP.

Mascot 

GIMP's mascot is called Wilber and was created in GIMP by Tuomas Kuosmanen, known as tigert, on September 25, 1997. Wilber received additional accessories from other GIMP developers, which can be found in the Wilber Construction Kit, included in the GIMP source code as /docs/Wilber_Construction_Kit.xcf.gz.

Distribution 
The current version of GIMP works with numerous operating systems, including Linux, macOS and Windows. Many Linux distributions, such as Fedora Linux and Debian., include GIMP as a part of their desktop operating systems.

GIMP began to host its own downloads after discontinuing use of SourceForge in 2013. The website later repossessed GIMP's dormant account and hosted advertising-laden versions of GIMP for Windows.

Professional reviews 
Lifewire reviewed GIMP favorably in March 2019, writing that "[f]or those who have never experienced Photoshop, GIMP is simply a very powerful image manipulation program," and "[i]f you're willing to invest some time learning it, it can be a very good graphics tool."

GIMP's fitness for use in professional environments is regularly reviewed; it is often compared to and suggested as a possible replacement for Adobe Photoshop. GIMP has similar functionality to Photoshop, but has a different user interface.

GIMP 2.6 was used to create nearly all of the art in Lucas the Game, an independent video game by developer Timothy Courtney. Courtney started development of Lucas the Game in early 2014, and the video game was published in July 2015 for PC and Mac. Courtney explains GIMP is a powerful tool, fully capable of large professional projects, such as video games.

The single-window mode introduced in GIMP 2.8 was reviewed in 2012 by Ryan Paul of Ars Technica, who noted that it made the user experience feel "more streamlined and less cluttered". Michael Burns, writing for Macworld in 2014, described the single-window interface of GIMP 2.8.10 as a "big improvement".

In his review of GIMP for ExtremeTech in October 2013, David Cardinal noted that GIMP's reputation of being hard to use and lacking features has "changed dramatically over the last couple years", and that it was "no longer a crippled alternative to Photoshop". He described GIMP's scripting as one of its strengths, but also remarked that some of Photoshop's features such as Text, 3D commands, Adjustment Layers and History are either less powerful or missing in GIMP. Cardinal favorably described the UFRaw converter for raw images used with GIMP, noting that it still "requires some patience to figure out how to use those more advanced capabilities". Cardinal stated that GIMP is "easy enough to try" despite not having as well developed documentation and help system as those for Photoshop, concluding that it "has become a worthy alternative to Photoshop for anyone on a budget who doesn't need all of Photoshop's vast feature set".

The user interface has been criticized for being "hard to use".

Features 

Tools used to perform image editing can be accessed via the toolbox, through menus and dialogue windows. They include filters and brushes, as well as transformation, selection, layer and masking tools.

Color 
There are several ways of selecting colors, including palettes, color choosers and using an eyedropper tool to select a colour on the canvas. The built-in color choosers include RGB/HSV/LAB/LCH selector or scales, water-color selector, CMYK selector and a color-wheel selector. Colors can also be selected using hexadecimal color codes, as used in HTML color selection. GIMP has native support for indexed colour and RGB color spaces; other color spaces are supported using decomposition, where each channel of the new color space becomes a black-and-white image. CMYK, LAB and HSV (hue, saturation, value) are supported this way. Color blending can be achieved using the Blend tool, by applying a gradient to the surface of an image and using GIMP's color modes. Gradients are also integrated into tools such as the brush tool, when the user paints this way the output color slowly changes. There are a number of default gradients included with GIMP; a user can also create custom gradients with tools provided. Gradient plug-ins are also available.

Selections and paths 
GIMP selection tools include a rectangular and circular selection tool, free select tool, and fuzzy select tool (also known as magic wand). More advanced selection tools include the select by color tool for selecting contiguous regions of color—and the scissors select tool, which creates selections semi-automatically between areas of highly contrasting colors. GIMP also supports a quick mask mode where a user can use a brush to paint the area of a selection. Visibly this looks like a red colored overlay being added or removed. The foreground select tool is an implementation of Simple interactive object extraction (SIOX), a method used to perform the extraction of foreground elements, such as a person or a tree in focus. The Paths Tool allows a user to create vectors (also known as Bézier curves). Users can use paths to create complex selections, including around natural curves. They can paint (or "stroke") the paths with brushes, patterns, or various line styles. Users can name and save paths for reuse.

Image editing 
There are many tools that can be used for editing images in GIMP. The more common tools include a paint brush, pencil, airbrush, eraser and ink tools used to create new or blended pixels. The Bucket Fill tool can be used to fill a selection with a color or pattern. The Blend tool can be used to fill a selection with a color gradient. These color transitions can be applied to large regions or smaller custom path selections.

GIMP also provides "smart" tools that use a more complex algorithm to do things that otherwise would be time-consuming or impossible. These include:
 Clone tool, which copies pixels using a brush
 Healing brush, which copies pixels from an area and corrects tone and color
 Perspective clone tool, which works like the clone tool but corrects for distance changes
 Blur and sharpen tool blurs and sharpens using a brush
 The Smudge tool can be used to subtly smear a selection where it stands.
 Dodge and burn tool is a brush that makes target pixels lighter (dodges) or darker (burns)

Layers, layer masks and channels 
An image being edited in GIMP can consist of many layers in a stack. The user manual suggests that "A good way to visualize a GIMP image is as a stack of transparencies," where in GIMP terminology, each level (analogous to a transparency) is called a layer. Each layer in an image is made up of several channels. In an RGB image, there are normally 3 or 4 channels, each consisting of a red, green and blue channel. Color sublayers look like slightly different gray images, but when put together they make a complete image. The fourth channel that may be part of a layer is the alpha channel (or layer mask). This channel measures opacity where a whole or part of an image can be completely visible, partially visible or invisible. Each layer has a layer mode that can be set to change the colors in the image.

Text layers can be created using the text tool, allowing a user to write on an image. Text layers can be transformed in several ways, such as converting them to a path or selection.

Automation, scripts and plug-ins 
GIMP has approximately 150 standard effects and filters, including Drop Shadow, Blur, Motion Blur and Noise.

GIMP operations can be automated with scripting languages. The Script-Fu is a Scheme-based language implemented using a TinyScheme interpreter built into GIMP. GIMP can also be scripted in Perl, Python (Python-Fu), or Tcl, using interpreters external to GIMP. New features can be added to GIMP not only by changing program code (GIMP core), but also by creating plug-ins. These are external programs that are executed and controlled by the main GIMP program. MathMap is an example of a plug-in written in C.

There is support for several methods of sharpening and blurring images, including the blur and sharpen tool. The unsharp mask tool is used to sharpen an image selectively – it sharpens only those areas of an image that are sufficiently detailed. The Unsharp Mask tool is considered to give more targeted results for photographs than a normal sharpening filter. The Selective Gaussian Blur tool works in a similar way, except it blurs areas of an image with little detail.

GIMP-ML is an extension for machine learning with 15 filters.

GEGL 
The Generic Graphics Library (GEGL) was first introduced as part of GIMP on the 2.6 release of GIMP. This initial introduction does not yet exploit all of the capabilities of GEGL; as of the 2.6 release, GIMP can use GEGL to perform high bit-depth color operations; because of this less information is lost when performing color operations. When GEGL is fully integrated, GIMP will have a higher color bit depth and better non-destructive work-flow. GIMP 2.8.xx supports only 8-bit of color, which is much less than what e.g. digital cameras produce (12-bit or more). Full support for high bit depth is included with GIMP 2.10. OpenCL enables hardware acceleration for some operations.

CTX 

CTX is a new rasterizer for vector graphics in GIMP 3.0. Some simple objects like lines and circles can be reduced to vector objects.

File formats 
GIMP supports importing and exporting with a large number of different file formats, GIMP's native format XCF is designed to store all information GIMP can contain about an image; XCF is named after the eXperimental Computing Facility where GIMP was authored. Import and export capability can be extended to additional file formats by means of plug-ins. XCF file size is extended to more than 4 GB since 2.9.6 and new stable tree 2.10.x.

Forks and derivatives 
Because of the free and open-source nature of GIMP, several forks, variants and derivatives of the computer program have been created to fit the needs of their creators. While GIMP is cross-platform, variants of GIMP may not be. These variants are neither hosted nor linked on the GIMP site. The GIMP site does not host GIMP builds for Windows or Unix-like operating systems either, although it does include a link to a Windows build.

Forks 
 CinePaint: Formerly Film Gimp, it is a fork of GIMP version 1.0.4, used for frame-by-frame retouching of feature film. CinePaint supports up to 32-bit IEEE-floating point color depth per channel, as well as color management and HDR. CinePaint is used primarily within the film industry due mainly to its support of high-fidelity image formats. It is available for BSD, Linux, and macOS.
 GIMP classic: A patch against GIMP v2.6.8 source code created to undo changes made to the user interface in GIMP v2.4 through v2.6. A build of GIMP classic for Ubuntu is available. As of March 2011, a new patch could be downloaded that patches against the experimental GIMP v2.7.
 GIMP Portable: A portable version of GIMP for Microsoft Windows XP or later that preserves brushes and presets between computers.
 GIMPshop: Derivative that aimed to replicate the Adobe Photoshop in some form. Development of GIMPshop was halted in 2006 and the project disavowed by the developer, Scott Moschella, after an unrelated party registered "GIMPshop" as part of an Internet domain name and passed off the website as belonging to Moschella while accepting donations and making revenue from advertising but passing on none of the income to Moschella.
 GimPhoto: GimPhoto follows the Photoshop-UI tradition of GIMPshop. More modifications are possible with the GimPad tool. GimPhoto stands at version 24.1 for Linux and Windows (based on GIMP v2.4.3) and version 26.1 on macOS (based on GIMP v2.6.8). Installers are included for Windows 7, 8.1, and 10; macOS 10.6+; Ubuntu 14 and Fedora; as well as source code. Only one developer is at work in this project, so fast updates and new versions based on Gimp 2.8.x or 2.9.x are not planned.
 McGimp: An independent port for macOS that is aim to run GIMP directly on this platform, and integrated multiple plug-ins intended to optimize photos.
 Seashore: easier to use image editing application for macOS.
 Glimpse: A discontinued UI rewrite stemming from a group of users who consider "GIMP" to be an ableist slur.

Extensions 

GIMP's functionality can be extended with plugins. Notable ones include:

 GIMP-ML, which provides machine learning-based image enhancement. GIMP-ML with python 3 is next target in development.
 GIMP Animation Package (GAP), official plugin for creating animations. GAP can save animations in several formats, including GIF and AVI.
 Resynthesizer, which provides content-aware fill. Original part of Paul Harrison's PhD thesis, now maintained by Lloyd Konneker.
 G'MIC, which adds image filters and effects.

See also

About GIMP 
 Libre Graphics Meeting
 List of computing mascots
 :Category:Computing mascots

About editing 
 Image editing
 Comparison of raster graphics editors
 List of raster graphics editors

Other 
 List of free and open-source software packages

References

Further reading

External links 

 
 
 
 GIMP magazine

1995 software
AmigaOS 4 software
Applications using D-Bus
Cross-platform free software
Free and open-source software
Free graphics software
Free multilingual software
Free photo software
Free raster graphics editors
Free software programmed in C
GNU Project software
Graphics software that uses GTK
IRIX software
Macintosh graphics software
MacOS graphics software
Portable software
Raster graphics editors for Linux
Raster graphics editors
Technical communication tools
Windows graphics-related software